Trinidad and Tobago competed in the 2014 Commonwealth Games in Glasgow, Scotland from 23 July to 3 August 2014. With the exception of the athletics squad, which was to be announced at a later date, the Trinidad and Tobago Olympic Committee revealed that they had selected a team of 84 athletes across 13 sports. On 29 June a track and field squad of 43 was named completing a team of 127 athletes.

Athletics

On 29 June, the Trinidad and Tobago Commonwealth Games Association and the Trinidad and Tobago Olympic Committee announced their track and field team.

Men

Women

Boxing

 Michael Alexander
 Aaron Prince

Cycling

Track
Sprint

Time trial

Keirin

Field hockey

Men's tournament

 Kwandwane Browne
 Ishmael Campbell
 Darren Cowie - Capt
 Shaquille Daniel
 Aidan De Gannes
 Solomon Eccles
 Dillet Gilkes
 Nicholas Grant
 Marcus James
 Tariq Marcano
 Stefan Mouttet
 Michael II Otis O'Connor
 Mickel Pierre
 Jordan Reynos
 Andrey Rocke
 Akim Toussaint
Pool B

Women's tournament

 Avion Ashton
 Kayla Braithwaithe
 Savanah De Fretias
 Dana-Lee De Gannes
 Petal Derry
 Amanda George
 Brianna Govia
 Zene Henry
 Brittney Hingh
 Kwylan Jaggassar
 Alanna Lewis - co-Capt
 Fiona O'Brien
 Amie Olton
 Elise Olton
 Tamia Roach
 Patricia Wright-Alexis - co-Capt
Pool A

Gymnastics

 Marissa Dick
 Khazia Hislop

Judo

Netball

 Janelle Barker
 Joelisa Cooper
 Rhonda John-Davis
 Kemba Duncan
 Candice Guerero
 Onella Jack
 Anika La Roche Brice
 Alicia Liverpool
 Tricia Liverpool
 Kalifa McCollin
 Daystar Swift
 Samantha Wallace

Pool B

Rugby sevens

Trinidad and Tobago has qualified a rugby sevens team.
 Kelson Figaro
 David Gokool
 Rowell Gordon
 Aasan Lewis
 Anthony Lopez
 Jonathon O'Connor
 James Phillip
 Joseph Quashie - Capt
 Jesse Richards
 Agboola Silverthorn
 Shaquille Tull
 Keishon Walker

Pool B

Shooting

 Rhodney Allen
 Roger Daniel
 Norris Gomez
 Marlon Moses
 Michael Perez

Squash

 Charlotte Knaggs
 Colin Ramasra
 Kerrie Sample
 Kale Wilson

Swimming

Men

Table tennis

 Rheann Chung
 Yuvraj Dookram
 Aleena Edwards
 Curtis Humphreys
 Ashley Quashie
 Dexter St Louis
 Catherine Spicer
 Aaron Wilson

Triathlon

References

Nations at the 2014 Commonwealth Games
Trinidad and Tobago at the Commonwealth Games
2014 in Trinidad and Tobago sport